Luke Boden (born 26 November 1988) is an English retired professional footballer who is currently an assistant coach for the Rollins College men's soccer team.

Career

England
Boden made his breakthrough when still a Sheffield Wednesday academy player. He was called up to the senior squad at the start of the 2006–07 season to ease the club's injury problems. He made his debut when he came on as a substitute in the Championship game at Plymouth Argyle on 19 August 2006.

On 18 September 2008 he was loaned out to League Two side Chesterfield for a month. Boden made his debut in the Spireites' 1–2 defeat at Rochdale on 20 September 2008. He played four games for the Spireites before a short loan spell with Rushden & Diamonds.

On 27 August 2009, Boden joined League Two side Northampton Town on a one-month loan deal.

United States
Boden was released from his contract with Sheffield Wednesday by mutual consent on 26 January 2011, and subsequently moved to play in the United States. He signed a two-year contract with Orlando City of the USL Pro league on 23 February 2011, and made his debut for his new team on 16 April as a second-half substitute in a game against the Charlotte Eagles.

Boden was released by Orlando at the end of the 2016 season, and subsequently signed with USL side Tampa Bay Rowdies on 6 January 2017.

Boden joined the Rollins Tars coaching staff ahead of the 2018 season. He is an assistant coach and the recruiting coordinator.

Personal
Boden holds a U.S. green card which qualifies him as a domestic player for MLS roster purposes.

Honours

Orlando City
USL Pro (3): 2011,2012, 2014
USL Pro Playoffs (2): 2011, 2013

Individual
USL Pro Team of the Season (1): 2014

References

External links
Luke Boden player profile at swfc.co.uk

1988 births
Living people
English footballers
English expatriate footballers
Sheffield Wednesday F.C. players
Chesterfield F.C. players
Rushden & Diamonds F.C. players
Northampton Town F.C. players
Orlando City SC (2010–2014) players
Orlando City SC players
Orlando City B players
Tampa Bay Rowdies players
Expatriate soccer players in the United States
English Football League players
USL Championship players
Major League Soccer players
English expatriate sportspeople in the United States
Association football fullbacks
Major Arena Soccer League players
Orlando SeaWolves players
Association football midfielders
Rollins Tars coaches
College men's soccer coaches in the United States